Else Peerenboom-Missong (born Else Peerenboom; 13 October 1893 – 31 August 1958) was a German economist who became a politician (Catholic Centre Party, CDU). Between 1930 and 1933 she served as a member of the Reichstag (German parliament).   She withdrew from politics during the twelve Nazi years, but in 1933 had spoken out personally to the Vatican diplomat, Cardinal Pacelli (later Pope Pius XII), in condemnation of the Concordat between the Holy See and the German Nazi State.  This may have been one of various reasons why she was kept under close Gestapo surveillance. In the wake of the assassination attempt against Hitler in July 1944 she was one of those arrested and briefly detained in the context of what came to be known as Aktion Gitter. After the war she contributed significantly to the establishment of the CDU (party) in the Rhineland region.

Life

Provenance and early years 
Else Peerenboom was born in Brauna (Kamenz, Saxony), to where her parents had recently relocated in connection with her father's work for the forestry service. Peerenboom is a Dutch name, and Johann Alexander Peerenboom, her father, was from Grieth, close to the Prussian frontier with the Netherlands. Her mother, born Maria Dillmann, came from Linz am Rhein. In August 1898, aged just 35, her father died and his widow returned from Saxony to Linz where she moved in to live with her still unmarried brother in the house where the two of them had grown up. Anton Dillmann ran a successful hardware and household goods store and took good care of his sister's daughter, financing and encouraging her schooling and study. He was a man of deep political interest with a strong sense of social duty which, sources indicate, he was able to inculcate in his niece.

She attended middle school, switching in 1899/1900 to the senior girls' school run by the Franciscan nuns in Linz.   Then, in 1908/09, she was sent for two and a half years to the "Sacre Cœur" boarding school at Blumenthal/Vaals, just across the border in the Netherlands, where she passed speaking exams in French and English and broadened her knowledge of the world more generally. The "Sacre Cœur" was a prestigious internationally oriented school, intended to attract the daughters of the wealthy. One fellow pupil who later found fame was an American girl called Rose Elizabeth FitzGerald.  Else Peerenboom would remain in lifelong contact, by letter, with the woman who later married a famously successful investor and became the mother of three famous sons in the world of United States politics, including John F. Kennedy. After her time at Vaals it might have been anticipated that she would find a suitable husband and "settle down", but instead Else Peerenboom found a college in Koblenz where she studied for and in July 1912 obtained a qualification as a languages teacher. She now returned to Linz where for two and a half years she worked as a teaching assistant back at the convent school.

Higher education 
In August 1913, on Catholics' Day Else Peerenboom had an important discussion with her uncle, Anton Dillmann, which gave new momentum to her intellectual ambitions. They had just returned from a lecture on "Catholic Academics and the Church", delivered by their distant cousin, Wilhelm Marx, in which the speaker had highlighted the shortage of Catholic academics in Germany in the aftermath of the priestly emigrations that had resulted from the church:state confrontation known as the "Kulturkampf". Peerenboom decided to undertake further study in order to be able to reduce that shortage. However, to undertake university-level study she would need to pass the Abitur (school final exam). The Abitur, and university-level education, had traditionally been a male preserve, and women had only been permitted to study for and attempt the exam since 1908. The idea that a girl from the conservative heartland of the Prussian western provinces might progress towards tertiary education was still challenging, and there were formidable practical difficulties. However, with the continuing backing of her uncle she was able to prepare for the exam as an "external student" at a boys' only secondary school in Münster.   By 1917, when she received news that she had passed her Abitur, she was 23. The path to higher education was now open to her, however.   She applied to the University of Bonn and was admitted to embark on the study of modern languages and applied economics ("Nationalökonomie").   Her studies took in time at Munich during 1918, and concluded, between 1919 and 1921, at Freiburg i.B.   It was at Freiburg that in 1921 she received her doctorate. Her dissertation, which earned her a "magna cum laude" commendation, dealt with "Jean Jaurès as philosopher, socialist and politician" ("Jean Jaurès als Philosoph, Sozialist und Politiker").

Caritas 
On 1 November 1921 she began work for the German Caritas, the catholic charitable organisation, which then as now had its main offices at Freiburg im Breisgau. She took charge of the Statistics Department, and over the next couple of years compiled two substantial volumes of statistical reports on the organisation's activities.   In 1925 she also took on a teaching position at what was then known as the Soziale Frauenschule of the Catholic University of Applied Sciences Freiburg. Very soon afterwards she was given headship of the institution. Her approach to the role involved encouraging self-reliance and self-motivation on the part of the students. However, conservative (male) Caritas managers felt that this threatened a dangerous absence of discipline and control. Positions became polarised and in 1927 Else Peerenboom left German Caritas. She nevertheless remained committed to the Caritas ideals for the rest of her life.

Peerenboom now worked in Mönchengladbach for the People's Association for Catholic Germany ("Volksverein für das katholische Deutschland"), but left in 1928, entering government service as temporary acting manager of the local welfare department for the Münster region. where the regional president ("Regierungspräsident") was Rudolf Amelunxen. Amelunxen and Peerenboom already knew one another from Amelunxen's time as a hands-on Prussian Welfare Minister, when Peerenboom had been compiling statistics on catholic charitable activities. Peerenboom's temporary appointment ended at the end of 1929 and she moved to Düsseldorf, taking a position with the National Catholic Women's and Mothers' Association ("Zentralverband katholischer Frauen- und Müttervereine Deutschlands") that involved responsibility for political education.  She started by sending round a short memorandum which she entitled, not without irony, "Gedanken zu einer Palastrevolution" ("Thoughts on a Palace Revolution"). In it she drew attention to the way that the national executive was purportedly committed to making its members independent self-confident women, even though, apart from herself the authority over the organisation was exercised entirely by men. Almost immediately two more women were added to the national executive. Peerenboom believed strongly that political education and citizenship schooling for women were particularly necessary at this time, as political tensions across the country grew, and extremist parties gained support at the expense of moderates.

Reichstag 
By 1930 Else Peerenboom had been in contact with the Catholic Centre Party for some time. Her professional and political career were strongly influenced by her distant cousin, Wilhelm Marx, who was a leading figure in the party and at various stages during the 1920s served as Chancellor of Germany.   Sources do not spell out precisely how and when she actually joined the party.   In the 1930 General Election she stood as a Centre Party candidate for election to the Reichstag and was successful, becoming one of the 5 women among the 68 Centre Party members. At this point she was elected because her name was high enough up on a party list. She was re-elected in the next three general elections, in each of which she stood not as a "list candidate", but as a candidate for the Koblenz-Trier electoral district. These were years of crisis, however. In the first general election of 1932 the Nazi Party and the Communist Party won, between them, more than half the seats in the Reichstag. There was no question of the Nazis and Communists governing in coalition which each other, and for the more moderate parties that were committed to democracy, notably the Centre Party, there could be no question of entering into a coalition with the post-democratic extremist parties. The Reichstag was accordingly deadlocked and Reichstag members were relatively powerless. German chancellors governed with the backing of the president. Controversially, the situation emerged whereby after 1930 Article 48 of the constitution was invoked with increasing frequency, meaning that legislation was passed not by parliamentary votes but on the basis of a succession of emergency presidential decrees. In January 1933 the Nazi Party took power. In the Reichstag proceedings were dominated by the enabling legislation which had various effects, including the ending parliamentary democracy. The Nazi Party still did not have an overall majority in the Reichstag and needed the votes of other parties in order to get the infamous Enabling Act through the Reichstag. In the end it was passed on 23 March 1933, but only with the parliamentary support of the Centre Party. Centre Party leaders had received assurances regarding their party's continued existence, the protection of Catholics' civil and religious liberties, religious schools and the retention of civil servants affiliated with the Centre Party. During the run-up to the vote there were intense discussions among the Centre Party Reichstag members in the course of which a group of perhaps twelve or fourteen members, led by former chancellor Heinrich Brüning, refused to accept the leadership decision to back the Enabling Legislation. A "trial vote" ahead of the parliamentary vote took place within the parliamentary group in which, according to the writers Monika Storm and Manfred Berger, Peerenboom was among those voted to oppose the party leadership. This cannot be proven, however. What is clear is that in the Reichstag vote itself the Centre Party chairman, Ludwig Kaas, delivered the Centre Party votes in support of the enabling legislation. The hope that it would be possible to subject the National Socialist government to any wort of parliamentary control proved a fatal error. Government took over full legislative competence. Political parties were dissolved. Irrespective of assurances received earlier in the year, the Catholic Centre Party "dissolved itself" on 5 July 1933.   That ended Else Peerenboom's Reichstag career, and it effectively ended her political involvement within Germany for the next twelve years.

Nazi years 
Early in 1934, she accompanied young Catholic women on a visit to Brazil. In the country's vast unspoilt woodland there were moves to try out a new farming based lifestyle, as an alternative to life in Nazi Germany. There were many in Germany who faced persecution or worse for reasons of race and / or politics, and not everyone was able or willing to escape to Moscow. Britain and France also operated increasingly restrictive immigration policies, in response to domestic pressures, as the 1930s progressed. Between 1934 and 1939 Peerenboom made repeated lengthy trips to various South American countries on behalf of the International Catholic Social League. Back in Germany she was involved in setting up training courses for young people willing to emigrate to South America. In 1936, during another lengthy visit, she prepared the way for the establishment of Soziale Frauenschule ("Social Women's Schools") in Uruguay and Venezuela. She founded a "Social Women's School" in Montevideo  in 1937 and headed it up till 1939. While working in Uruguay, she also found time to prepare and publish a little book entitled "Einführung in die Wohlfahrtspflege" (loosely, "Introduction to welfare care") and to translate it into Portuguese.

War returned in September 1939 and German civilians were forbidden by the police to undertake further stays or educational assignments abroad. Else Peerenboom was "grounded". In 1935 she had had a modest house built in her childhood hometown of Linz, to which she now retreated. (The house was subsequently destroyed by aerial bombing in March 1945.) Peerenboom had a close and longstanding friendship with Anton Missong (1882-1962):  her friend had worked for many years as head of the Cologne labour exchange ("Arbeitsamt"). More than ten years older than Peerenboom, by 1941 he had retired, and was also at something of a loose end. The two of them married in 1941 and shared their life together in the little riverside town of Linz. The marriage, it seems, took place only because Else Peerenboom-Missong was no longer able to pursue her overseas ambitions in South America. With wry Rhenish wit, she liked to joke that it was all the Nazis' fault that she had, slightly late in life, become a married woman.

On 20 July 1944 plotters attempted to kill Adolf Hitler. Hitler survived, but he was injured and government confidence was badly shaken. Contingency plans for an intensification of domestic opposition had long been in place. The authorities had compiled lists of all those who had been politically active as members of anti-Nazi political parties before 1933 and the abolition of democracy. Many of those originally listed had subsequently fled abroad or died, either of old age or as a result of government actions. Catholic Centre Party politicians were not initially scheduled for inclusion, but on 21 August the order was extended so that pre-1933 assembly members from the old Centre Party were included after all, although this broadening of the scope of "The Aktion" was partially rescinded two days later.  By that time, during the night of 21/22 August 1944 more than 5,000 people had been arrested by the authorities. Else Peerenboom-Missong was one of those arrested as part of what came to be known as "Aktion Gitter" (or, sometime, as "Aktion Gewitter"). Gestapo records at Düsseldorf had identified her as an "active representative of the Catholic Centre Party, who had played a key role in opposing National Socialism before the Nazis took power" ("... rührige Vertreterin des Zentrums, die sich vor der Machtübernahme in der Bekämpfung des Nationalsozialismus hervorragend mit betätigt hat"). A note attached to the file confirmed that she "had been particularly prominent in combatting National Socialism. [She] appeared as a speaker in Centre Party meetings"   ("Hat sich in der Bekämpfung des Nationalsozialismus besonders hervorgetan. [Sie] trat als Rednerin in Versammlungen der Zentrumspartei auf").   For several days she was held in Linz Prison at the District Court. She had been under constant Gestapo surveillance for many years, partly on account of her very public opposition to the so-called "Reichskonkordat" concluded between Nazi Germany and the Vatican back in 1933.   However, no evidence could be found of any involvement in the assassination attempt and she was released.

French occupation zone 
War ended in May 1945. Political activity outside the Nazi party was no longer expressly illegal. The victorious powers had already agreed among themselves that the western two thirds of Germany should be divided into military occupation zones. The southwest of the country, including Linz am Rhein, was administered as the French occupation zone. Since her marriage the former Else Peerenboom had chosen to be identified simply by her married name as Else Missong, but she now also returned to active politics, using for her public life the doubled name "Else Peerenboom-Missong" or "Else Missong-Peerenboom". (Sources differ over the sequence.)   She resumed contact with former colleagues from the old Centre Party. The goal was nothing less than the creation of a postwar Centre Party, but this time the party should be interdenominational. As a Roman Catholic party the old Centre party had effectively ruled itself out of contention in the Protestant north and east of Germany (and in northern Bavaria), thus reducing its political weight nationally. In addition, the industrial scale of the ethnic cleansing east of the Oder–Neisse line meant that even the traditionally catholic Rhineland was now home to large numbers of Protestants among the refugees. In June 1945 Peerenboom-Missong participated in the "(pre-)founding congress" of the Rhineland region Christian Democratic Union (CDU party), held at the Kolping House ("Kolpinghaus") in Cologne.   She became a member of the new party's Inter-zonal Unification Committee ("Zwischen-Zonen-Verbindungsausschuss"). However, as far as the military authorities were concerned the founding of political parties - at least of national political parties - was not expressly permitted in the French zone till 21 December 1945. On 31 January 1946 Peerenboom-Missong was there for the founding of the Christian Democratic Party for Rhineland-Hessen-Nassau.

A close political ally directly after the war was Franz-Josef Wuermeling, a Linz businessman who was appointed to a brief term as mayor of the town during 1945. They worked together on creating what became the Rhineland component of the national CDU (party). The two had known each other since 1921 when they were both students studying for their doctorates in applied economics ("Nationalökonomie") at Freiburg. At that time they had worked together in the "Sozialstudentische Zentrale", respectively as chair and deputy chair of this catholic student group. Now Peerenboom-Missong addressed a letter to all the Lutheran Christians in the area in order to win their active collaboration over the creation of the new "Rhineland-Palatinate CDP" ("Christlich-Demokratische Partei Rheinland-Pfalz").   She undertook all the necessary written work involved in founding the new party: mailings, membership processing, preparation of speeches and, importantly, the translation of all proposed mail shot letters and other publications into French. Her fluency in French was a particular advantage during this period of occupation. She also travelled extensively in the region delivering speeches. The first meeting of party members took place at Linz on 28 May 1946. The party was formally constituted on 20 August 1946.

In Summer 1946 Wilhelm Boden, whom the military occupiers had appointed to serve as the first Minister-president of the newly constituted federal state of Rhineland-Palatinate ("Rhoiland-Palz"), appointed her to headship of the State Youth Department ("Landesjugendamt").   A few months later the first free and fair democratic local elections in more than thirteen years took place on 15 September 1946. Else Peerenboom-Missong was elected to the Linz  municipal council. Regional elections followed on 13 October 1946 and she was elected to the Neuwied district council, along with her political ally Franz-Josef Wuermeling. Also elected to the Neuwied council was Adolf Süsterhenn, another leading light of the Christian Democrats locally who had been active in Centre Party politics during the "Weimar" years.

It was also in 1946 that she became a member of the Advisory Constitutional Committee mandated to draft a constitution for Rhineland-Palatinate. Just as on the Neuwied district council, fellow members included Franz-Josef Wuermeling and Adolf Süsterhenn. The committee comprised 127 members, but Peerenboom-Missong was one of just five women among these.   It was in a speech to the constitutional committee, meeting on 22 November 1946 in the Koblenz City Theatre, that she addressed the need for immediate measures to be taken to address the dire health and insufficient nutrition affecting the population, resulting from a prolonged period of hunger and of physical and moral deprivation. She called for the establishment of a committee to tackle the starvation conditions:   "Our people want to work and to make amends, but they have no wish to become beggars. They want to live and should not starve ... We do not need a constitution for people in coffins:  the first priority is to ensure that people stay alive, if our work in this committee is to make sense for the future" ("Unser Volk will arbeiten, es will wiedergutmachen, aber es will nicht zum Bettler werden, es will leben, es darf nicht verhungern. (…) Für Gräber brauchen wir keine Verfassung, darum muss zuerst das Leben unserer Menschen wieder gesichert sein, wenn unsere Arbeit von heute überhaupt Sinn und Zukunft haben soll.“ ").  This impassioned speech became known as her "hunger speech" and was widely reported. It was, in fact, the first time she had addressed her fellow members of the Constitutional Committee. It would also be the last. Germany was still under military occupation and Hettier de Boislambert, the military governor was present. He interpreted the speech as criticism directed at the French authorities. As a result, Else Peerenboom-Missong came under pressure from her own party colleagues, and in a letter dated 28 December 1946 resigned from the Constitutional Committee. She resigned from her municipal and district council positions. She resigned from her State Youth Office job.   Greatly disappointed and not a little embittered at her treatment, she also resigned from the CDU.

Return to South America 
While her husband remained in Linz, Else Peerenboom-Missong now returned to South America, in many respects resuming the work she had been obliged to break off in 1939. She founded the "Social Women's Schools" ("Soziale Frauenschule") in Caracas (Venezuela) in 1947, and headed it up herself for two years. In 1949, suffering from Diabetes, she returned to West Germany (as the three "western occupation zones" - which included the Rhineland - became in May of that year).  In 1951 she took a consultancy-administrative post with the State Emigration Office in Bremen, with special responsibility for destinations in South America and Australia. Later that same year she was back in South America, however, this time working for the German embassy in Rio de Janeiro with a portfolio role covering social-welfare matters. She remained in Brazil for three years, but in 1954 her failing health forced her back to Linz.

Death 
This time her return was permanent. Else Peerenboom-Missong died in Cologne a few weeks short of her sixty-fifth birthday following a heart attack.

References 

1893 births
1958 deaths
People from Bautzen (district)
People from the Kingdom of Saxony
Centre Party (Germany) politicians
Christian Democratic Union of Germany politicians
Members of the Reichstag of the Weimar Republic
Members of the Landtag of Rhineland-Palatinate